A spiropyran is a type of organic chemical compound, known for photochromic properties that provide this molecule with the ability of being used in medical and technological areas. Spiropyrans were discovered in the early twentieth century. However, it was in the middle twenties when Fisher and Hirshbergin observed their photochromic characteristics and reversible reaction. In 1952, Fisher and co-workers announced for the first time photochromism in spiropyrans. Since then, there have been many studies on photochromic compounds that have continued up to the present.

Synthesis
There are two  methods for the production of spiropyrans. The first one can be by condensation of methylene bases with o-hydroxy aromatic aldehydes (or the condensation of the precursor of methylene bases). Spiropyrans generally could be obtained by boiling the aldehyde and the respective benzazolium salts in presence of pyridine or piperidine. The general formula of the synthesis of spiropyrans is shown in the Figure 1.

The second way is by condensation of o-hydroxy aromatic aldehydes with the salts of heterocyclic cations which contains active methylene groups and isolation of the intermediate styryl salts. This second procedure is followed by the removal of the elements of the acid from the obtained styryl salt, such as perchloric acid, with organic bases (gaseous ammonia or amines).

Structure 
A spiropyran is a 2H-pyran isomer that has the hydrogen atom at position two replaced by a second ring system linked to the carbon atom at position two of the pyran molecule in a spiro way. So there is a carbon atom which is common on both rings, the pyran ring and the replaced ring. The second ring, the replaced one, is usually heterocyclic but there are exceptions.

When the spiropyran is in a solution with polar solvents or when it receives heating (thermochromism) or radiation (photochromism) it becomes coloured because its structure has changed and it has been transformed into the merocyanine form.

The structural differences between spiropyran and merocyanine form is that, while in the first one the ring is in the closed form, in the other one the ring is opened. The photochromism is due to electrocyclic cleavage of the C-spiro-O bond with photoexcitation.

Photochromism
Photochromism is the phenomenon that produces a change of colour in a substance by incident radiation. In other words, Photochromism is a light induced change of colour of a chemical substance. The spiropyrans are one of the photochromatic molecules that have raised more interest lately. These molecules consist of two heterocyclic functional groups in orthogonal planes bound by a carbon atom. Spiropyrans are one of the oldest families of photochromism. As solids, the spiropyrans do not present photochromism. It is possible in solution and in the dry state that radiation between 250 nm and 380 nm (approximately) is able to, by breaking the C-O binding, transform the spiropyrans into its colour emitting merocyanin-form. The structure of the colourless molecules, the substrate of the reaction (N), is more thermodynamically stable than the product – depending on the solvent in which it is stored. For example in NMP the equilibrium could be switched more toward the merocyanin form (solvatochromic effects). The photoisomers of the spiropyrans have a structure similar to cyanines, even though it is not symmetric about the center of the polymethine chain, and it is classified as a merocyanine (Figure 2).

Once the irradiation has stopped, the merocyanine in solution starts to discolour and to revert to its original form, the spiropyran (N).
Procedure:
 Irradiation of spiropyrans in solution with UV light of wavelength 250–380 nm breaks C-O bonds.
 Consequently, the structure of the initial molecule changes, the resulting one being merocyanine (MC). Because of the apparent conjugated system after UV illumination the extinction coefficient of the MC-form is significantly higher than the one of the closed spiropyran form.
 Unlike the initial solution, the product of the photochromism reaction is not colourless.
Depending on substituent on the aromatic system the switching behaviour of the derivatives can change in their switching velocity and photo-fatigue resistance.

Applications
Photochromic, thermochromic, solvatochromic and electrochromic characteristics of spiropyrans make them especially important in the technology area. Most of their applications are based on their photochromic properties.

Photochromic compounds based on spiropyrans, spirooxazines, and [2H]chromenes are being investigated because of their silver-free light-sensitive properties that could be used for optical recording data, including thin films,  photoswitches (sensors that discern light of certain wavelength), light filters with modulated transmission and miniature hybrid multifunctional materials.

Thanks to the creation of novel media sensitive to IR radiation and the potential of spiropyrans for optical recording data, semiconductor lasers as activating source of radiation are possible.
Spiropyrans with ion complexes and spiropyran copolymers which are part of powdered and film materials have been used too to record optical data and increase the length of time of its storage.

Another group of spiropyrans which contain indoline or nitrogen heterocycles and the indolinospirothiapyrans found their application in film forms of photochromic materials using polyester resins. Those resins with a high refractive index were used to make photochromic lenses. Moreover, spiropyrans are being used in cosmetics.

New types of modified spiropyrans polymers contained in photochromic compounds found their use in the creation of photoreceptors. The ones with rhodopsin as a compound are adopted to raise the level of the photosignal.

Another collection of spiropyrans characterized for their sensitivity to UV radiation are detectors for the protection of organs, for the production of light filters with modulated transmission, or photochromic lenses.

The determination of peroxidase activity and NO2 levels in the atmosphere are applications of carboxylated spiropyrans.

Today, spiropyrans are most used as molecular logic devices, photochromic and electrooptical devices, molecular and supramolecular logic switches, photoswitches and multifunctional artificial receptors.

Spiropyrans can be used to probe the conformational state of DNA, as certain derivatives can intercalate into DNA when in the open form.

Spiropyrans are used in photo controlled transfer of amino acids across bilayers and membranes because of nucleophilic interaction between zwitterionic merocyanine and polar amino acids. Certain types of spiropyrans display ring opening upon recognition of an analyte, for example zinc ions.

References 

Spiro compounds
Pyrans
Photochemistry